This is a list of natural gas companies in the United States.

List
Alabama – Spire
Alaska – Enstar Natural Gas, Fairbanks Natural Gas
Arizona – Southwest Gas Corporation, Transwestern Pipeline
Arkansas - Chesapeake Operating Inc, CenterPoint Energy Gas Transmission, Kinder Morgan, Inc.,  Mississippi River Transmission,  SourceGas Arkansas Inc., Spectra Energy, Inc., Arkansas Oklahoma Gas Corporation, Black Hills Energy
California – City of Long Beach Gas & Oil Department, City of Palo Alto Gas Department, Pacific Gas & Electric, San Diego Gas & Electric, Southern California Gas,  Sierra Pacific - Nevada & California, Southwest Gas Corporation, Vernon Light & Power Department, Clean Energy
Colorado – Atmos Energy, El Paso Natural Gas, Patara Oil & Gas,  SourceGas Distribution, LLC, Transwestern Pipeline, Xcel Energy, Murex Petroleum, Black Hills Energy
Connecticut – City of Norwich Department of Public Utilities, Eversource Energy (via Yankee Gas), UIL Holdings Corp (via Connecticut Natural Gas and Southern Connecticut Gas), 
Delaware – Chesapeake Utilities, Delmarva Power
District of Columbia – Washington Gas
Florida – metl, Florida Gas Transmission Company, Mirabito Gas, TECO Peoples Gas, Florida Public Utilities, Lake Apopka Natural Gas
Georgia – Southern Company Gas, Gas South
Hawaii - Hawai'i Gas
Kansas – Aquila, Inc., Atmos Energy, Kansas Gas Service, Panhandle Eastern Pipe Line, Xcel Energy, Black Hills Energy
Kentucky – Atmos Energy, EQT Corporation, Columbia Gas, People's Gas, Chesapeake Energy
Louisiana – Atmos Energy, Florida Gas Transmission Company, Gulf South Pipe Line, Trunkline Gas Company, Entergy
Idaho – Avista Utilities, Intermountain Gas Company
Illinois – Direct Energy,Ameren Illinois Company, Hudson Energy, Illinois Gas Transmission, Nicor Gas, Panhandle Eastern Pipe Line, Peoples Gas, North Shore Gas, Integrys
Indiana – Direct Energy, Panhandle Eastern Pipe Line, Vectrennipsco
Iowa - MidAmerican Energy Company, Black Hills Energy
Maine – Unitil Corp., Bangor Gas, Maine Natural Gas, Summit Natural Gas
Maryland – Columbia Gas of Maryland - Baltimore Gas & Electric, Chesapeake Utilities, Direct Energy, Easton Utilities, Northeast Utilities, Sandpiper Energy,  UGI, Washington Gas
Massachusetts – Berkshire Gas, Blackstone Gas Company, Colonial Gas, Columbia Gas of Massachusetts, Eversource Energy, Holyoke Gas and Electric, Liberty Utilities, Middleboro Municipal Gas and Electric Department, National Grid, Unitil Corporation, Wakefield Municipal Gas and Light Department, Westfield Gas and Electric Department
Michigan – Consumers Energy, Direct Energy, DTE Energy, Semco Energy, TransCanada, We Energies
Mississippi - Atmos Energy
Missouri – Missouri Gas Energy, City Utilities of Springfield, Laclede Gas, Spire Inc
Minnesota – Xcel Energy, CenterPoint Energy
Montana - Northwestern Corporation, MDU Resources, Energy West Montana, Cut Bank Gas Company
Nebraska - Metropolitan Utilities District,  SourceGas Distribution, LLC, Northwestern Corporation, Black Hills Energy
Nevada –  NV Energy, Southwest Gas Corporation
New Jersey – Direct Energy, Elizabethtown Gas, New Jersey Resources, New Jersey Natural, Public Service Enterprise Group, South Jersey Industries, Public Service Electric and Gas (PSE&G)
New Hampshire – Eversource Energy, Unitil Corporation
New Mexico –  Transwestern Pipeline, Xcel Energy, New Mexico Gas (NMG)
New York – Central Hudson Gas & Electric, Corning Natural Gas,  Direct Energy, National Fuel Gas, National Grid USA, Consolidated Edison, Rochester Gas & Electric (RG&E), New York State Electric & Gas (NYSEG), St. Lawrence Gas
North Carolina – Duke Energy, Piedmont Natural Gas, XOOM Energy, Public Service of North Carolina (PSNC), Frontier Natural Gas, 
North Dakota – Xcel Energy, MDU Resources
Ohio – Direct Energy, East Ohio Gas, Duke Energy, Nisource, Columbia Gas of Ohio, Dominion, Northeast Ohio Natural Gas, Orwell Natural Gas
Oklahoma – Chesapeake Energy, Oklahoma Gas & Electric, Oklahoma Natural Gas, ONEOK,  Xcel Energy, Arkansas Oklahoma Gas Corporation
Oregon – Avista Utilities, Northwest Natural Gas, Cascade Natural Gas
Pennsylvania – CNX Resources, Direct Energy, EQT Corporation, National Fuel Gas, PECO Energy Company, Peoples Natural Gas, Philadelphia Gas Works, UGI
Rhode Island – National Grid USA - Columbia Gas of Pennsylvania
South Carolina – Piedmont Natural Gas, SCANA Corporation Lancaster County Natural Gas Authority, Patriots Energy Group, York County Gas Authority, Chester County Gas Authority, Fountain Inn Natural Gas, SCE&G, Dominion Carolina Gas Transmission, Fort Hill Natural Gas Authority
South Dakota – Xcel Energy, Northwestern Corporation, MDU Resources,
Tennessee – Atmos Energy, Piedmont Natural Gas
Texas – Atmos Energy, Texas Gas Service, SiEnergy, Oro Negro, Lewis Energy, CenterPoint Energy Florida Gas Transmission Company, ConocoPhillips, CoServ Gas, Direct Energy, Gulf South Pipe Line, Patara Oil & Gas LLC, Texas Natural Gas,  Transwestern Pipeline, J-W Operating Company, Xcel Energy, Talos Energy
Utah – Dominion Energy
Vermont – Énergir
Virginia – Atmos Energy, EQT Corporation, Washington Gas, Virginia Natural Gas, Columbia Gas of Virginia - Dominion Energy, Columbia Gas Transmission, Appalachian Natural Gas Distribution Company, Roanoke Gas Company, Carroll County Natural Gas, CNX Resources
Washington – Avista Utilities, Puget Sound Energy,  Cascade Natural Gas, Northwest Natural Gas, City of Ellensburg
West Virginia – EQT Corporation, NiSource, Bluefield Natural Gas, Mountaineer Gas Company
Wisconsin – We Energies, Xcel Energy, Madison Gas & Electric
Wyoming –  SourceGas Distribution, LLC, Dominion Energy, MDU Resources, Black Hills Energy.

See also
 Lists of public utilities

Natural Gas

United States natural gas companies